Elachista infuscata is a moth of the family Elachistidae. It is found in Italy, Switzerland and Greece.

Taxonomy
It has been treated as a synonym of Elachista exactella.

References

infuscata
Moths described in 1882
Moths of Europe